Clubul Sportiv Oșorhei is a Romanian professional football club from Oșorhei, Bihor County, founded in 2000. The team currently plays in Liga IV.

History

Founded in 2000 as Tricolorul Alparea, the club played for 12 years at amateur level, in Liga IV – Bihor County, until their promotion to Liga III in 2012 after a play-off match, against Someşul Cărăşeu, won with the score of 1–0. After promotion, they changed their name from Tricolorul Alparea to CS Oșorhei.
In the three seasons spent on the third level of the Romanian football they finished on honorable places: 3rd, 4th and 5th.
The major objective of the club is to promote young players.
In 2015 they have entered into a partnership with Liga II club Bihor Oradea.

Chronology of names

Stadium

The club plays its home matches on Stadionul Comunal from Alparea.

Honours
Liga IV – Bihor County
Winners (2): 2005–06, 2011–12

Players

First team squad

Club Officials

Board of directors

Current technical staff

References

External links

Football clubs in Bihor County
Association football clubs established in 2000
Liga III clubs
Liga IV clubs
2000 establishments in Romania